CPAC may refer to:

Conferences
 Conservative Political Action Conference, an annual gathering of conservative activists in the United States, and/or associated activities in other countries 
 Castle Point Anime Convention, an annual anime convention held in Hoboken, New Jersey, U.S.

Organizations

 Carpenter Performing Arts Center, at California State University, Long Beach, U.S.
 Casula Powerhouse Arts Centre, Sydney, Australia
 Central Plains Athletic Conference, former name of the Manitoba Colleges Athletic Conference, Canada
 Colorado Photographic Arts Center, in Denver, Colorado, U.S.
 Community Police Accountability Council, watchdog organization in Chicago, Illinois, U.S.
 CPAC, Inc., former parent company of the Fuller Brush Company
 CPAC (TV channel) (Cable Public Affairs Channel), a Canadian specialty television channel

Schools 
 Central Philippine Adventist College, educational institution in the Philippines